Nicholas "Nick" Mwendwa  (born 29 December 1979) is a Kenyan businessman, Techprenuer and the president of the Football Kenya Federation (FKF). He is the current president of the Football Kenya Federation (FKF), replacing Sam Nyamweya with victory at the federation's 2016 elections.

Business and Career 
Nick mwendwa is the CEO and founder of the Riverbank Solutions Limited In November 2021, Nick Mwenda was arrested on corruption charges.

References

Living people
Kenyan businesspeople
Leaders of organizations
1979 births